Zossen is a German town in the district of Teltow-Fläming in Brandenburg, about  south of Berlin, and next to the B96 highway. Zossen consists of several smaller municipalities, which were grouped together in 2003 to form the city.

Geography
Since the 2003 municipal reform, Zossen consists of the following districts and municipalities:

History
Zossen, like most places in Brandenburg, was originally a Slavic settlement. Its name (Upper Sorbian: Sosny) may derive from Sosna meaning pine, a tree quite common in the region.

In 1875, Zossen railway station opened on the railway line from Berlin to Dresden and the Prussian military railway to the artillery range at Kummersdorf-Gut in present-day Am Mellensee. Between 1901 and 1904, Zossen adopted the use of different high-speed vehicles, such as electric locomotives and trams, for transportation to and from Berlin-Marienfelde. These vehicles were powered by an alternating current of 15 kV and used a variable frequency. The power was transmitted by three vertical overhead lines.

In 1910, a proving ground and a garrison of the Imperial German Army was established at the Waldstadt section of the Wünsdorf community – surviving to the present day. In World War I it was the site of several prisoner-of-war camps, including the "crescent camp" (Halbmondlager for Muslims who had fought for the Triple Entente), where the first wooden mosque in Germany was erected. The camp ran from 1915 until 1917, and was used as a show camp for propaganda purposes, as well as an attempt to encourage the prisoners to fight for the Central Powers.

From 1939 to 1945, Wünsdorf hosted the underground headquarters of the German Wehrmacht (OKW) and Army's High Command (OKH).

After World War II the area became the site of a Soviet military camp in East Germany known as "Little Moscow" or the "Forbidden City", the largest outside Russia, housing as many as 75,000 Soviet men, women and children with daily trains going to Moscow, until Soviet troops pulled out in August 1994. Since then it has returned to civilian use as the Wünsdorf-Waldstadt book town (founded in 1998), although much of it lies abandoned with evidence of Soviet occupation clearly visible. By late 2019, roughly 1,700 apartments were made from the old barracks, with another 700 planned for subsequent years.

A 2017 news report indicates that at the peak, the camp was home to some 75,000 Soviet persons; stores, schools and leisure centres were available to them. After the camp was abandoned, the authorities found "98,300 rounds of ammunition, 47,000 pieces of ordnance, 29.3 tonnes of munitions and rubbish, including chemicals ... houses were full of domestic appliances".

While new uses have not been found for the installations and bunkers of the unmodified areas of the military camp, they are somewhat maintained and there are various guided tours, exhibits and events. Some parts remain off-limits.

Timeline

1809/1810: Kietz and the vineyards of Zossen are suburbanised
1885: Monument to the fallen soldiers of the 1864, 1866, and 1870 wars is erected in Kietz
1906: School on Kirchplatz is expanded
1910: Military area between Zossen and Wünsdorf is developed
1932: Flyers of the town councillor and deacon  regarding the threatening change in the Protestant community and the city Zossen
1933: As a result of the National Socialists' rise to power, Socialists and Communists in Zossen are arrested by SS troops and are held in the school on Kirchplatz. Emil Phillip is removed from his post, upon the order of Pastor Eckerts
1934: Expansion of the town hall
1939: The military zone in Zossen is developed into military headquarters
1956: The city park is created
1992: The "Alter Krug" Zossen society is founded
1994: Formation of the administrative district of Teltow-Fläming from the old districts of Jüterbog, Luckenwalde, and Zossen
1996: 450th anniversary of Prince Elector Joachim II's awarding of rights and privileges to Zossen
1998: Wünsdorf Book Town declared, the only book town in Germany – though Mühlbeck-Friedersdorf, which started in 1997, claims to be the first book town in Germany.

Demography

Mayors 
 Hans-Jürgen Lüders (SPD) 1993–2003 
 Michaela Schreiber: 2003-2019
 Wiebke Schwarzweller: since 2019

Notable people 

 Karl Friedrich August Lehmann (1843–1893), stenographer and inventor of the  shorthand system
 Frieda Kassen (1895–1970), politician (SPD)
 Walter Budeus (1902–1944), Communist and resistance fighter
 Roy Präger (born 1971), football player

See also 
Großer Wünsdorfer See
List of Soviet military sites in Germany

References

External links

 Zossen Home page — in German only

Localities in Teltow-Fläming
Teltow (region)
Military facilities of the Soviet Union in Germany